Jómsvikingadrápa is a 13th-century skaldic poem composed by Bjarni Kolbeinsson (d. 1222), Bishop of Orkney. It is a tribute in drápa form  to the fallen Jomsvikings at the Battle of Hjörungavágr.

References

Other sources
Chase, Martin  (2014 ) Eddic, Skaldic, and Beyond: Poetic Variety in Medieval Iceland and Norway (Fordham University Press) 
Crawford, Barbara E. (1987) Scandinavian Scotland (Leicester University Press)  
Pulsiano, Phillip; Kirsten Wolf  (1993) Medieval Scandinavia: An Encyclopedia (Taylor & Francis) 
Ross, Margaret Clunies (2011) A History of Old Norse Poetry   (DS Brewer)

External links
 Jómsvikingadrápa in Old Norse
 The Skaldic Project - An international project to edit the corpus of medieval Norse-Icelandic skaldic poetry
Bishop Bjarni Kolbeinsson (St. Magnus Cathedral)

Skaldic poems
13th-century poems
Jomsvikings